Henry M. Rivera (born September 25, 1946) is an American attorney who served as a Commissioner of the Federal Communications Commission from 1981 to 1985. Rivera was the first Hispanic person to hold the office of FCC Commissioner. Rivera is currently a partner at Wiley Rein LLP.

References

1946 births
Living people
Members of the Federal Communications Commission
New Mexico Democrats
Reagan administration personnel